In law enforcement, a manhunt is an extensive and thorough search for a wanted and dangerous fugitive involving the use of police units, technology, and help from the public.

A manhunt is conducted when the suspect believed to be responsible for a serious crime is at large and is believed to be within a certain area. Any police units within reach of the area will then participate in the search, each covering parts of the area. If possible, the officers will form a perimeter around the area, guarding any and all possible escape routes from the containment.

A manhunt may have one of the following outcomes:
The successful capture of the suspect within the area of the manhunt
The death of the suspect within the area of the manhunt.
Escape from the area by the suspect, followed by plans by other law enforcement agencies to search for the suspect elsewhere
The search being called off, if police determine the chances of catching the suspect are minimal

Also, if the fugitive resists using deadly force with the law enforcement officers, they are typically authorized to respond in kind.

Fugitive manhunt agencies and organizations

AFOSI
Bounty hunter
British Security Service (MI5)
Greater London Metropolitan Police
Federal Bureau of Investigation
FBI Hostage Rescue Team
INTERPOL
Royal Canadian Mounted Police
Special Weapons and Tactics (SWAT) Teams
Texas Ranger Division of the Texas Department of Public Safety
US Marshals Service
Central Reserve Police Force
CoBRA

Public involvement
Sometimes, police departments conducting manhunts will solicit help from the public in locating the suspect. They will do this by broadcasting a description and other information on television, radio, and other public media, by going door to door and asking individuals if they have seen the suspect, and by placing wanted posters in public places.

When this happens, citizens are advised not to personally confront the suspect, but rather to call police and report their sightings.

One type of manhunt for which public participation is normally sought is an AMBER Alert. In an Amber Alert, the main purpose of the mission is to rescue the victim, ahead of the capture of the suspect. The public is usually given notice of an Amber Alert through additional forms of media, including highway overhead signs and text messaging.

If anyone is found aiding the suspect in any way, such as helping the suspect in hiding, or providing false information to the police about the suspect, may face legal consequences themselves, even being charged for the same crime as the suspect.

Notable manhunts

1982 Chicago Tylenol murders
1993 shootings at CIA Headquarters
2001 anthrax attacks
2010 Northumbria Police manhunt
2015 death of Joe Gliniewicz
2019 Northern British Columbia murders
Adam Yahiye Gadahn
Adolf Eichmann
Albert Johnson
Aribert Heim
Beltway sniper attacks and search for John Allen Muhammad and Lee Boyd Malvo
Bojinka plot (Abdul Hakim Murad, Wali Khan Amin Shah)
Bonnie and Clyde
Christopher Jordan Dorner
Henry Every
Jack Unterweger
John Dillinger
John Wilkes Booth
Josef Mengele
Joseph Palczynski
Jürgen Conings
Malcolm Naden
Maurice Clemmons, see also Lakewood shootings
Robert Vesco
The Green River Killer
Veerappan
Zodiac Killer

Bombing suspects

1993 World Trade Center bombing (Ramzi Yousef, Abdul Rahman Yasin)
Abu Ali al-Harithi
Boston Marathon bombing (Dzhokhar and Tamerlan Tsarnaev)
Centennial Olympic Park bombing (Eric Rudolph)
Khalid Sheikh Mohammed
Oklahoma City bombing (Terry Nichols)
Osama bin Laden
Pan Am Flight 73 (Zayd Hassan Abd Al-Latif Masud Al Safarini)
Pan Am Flight 103
Pan Am Flight 103 bombing investigation
Ted Kaczynski (Unabomber)
TWA Flight 847

Prison escapees

2010 Arizona prison escape
2015 Clinton Correctional Facility escape
Aafia Siddiqui
Ante Gotovina
Charles Victor Thompson
Clark Rockefeller
Clovis, New Mexico jail break
Frank Morris, John Anglin, and Clarence Anglin, escapees of Alcatraz during 1962. Their fates remain unknown.
El Chapo
Goran Hadžić
Mas Selamat bin Kastari
Mecklenburg Correctional Center escapees from Death Row
Operation Crevice
Operation Kratos
Project Coronado - a four-year manhunt which targeted members of the La Familia Michoacana drug cartel.
Radovan Karadžić
Ratko Mladić
Texas Seven

Famous fictional manhunts
The federal manhunt for George Foyet in the FBI crime drama Criminal Minds.
The manhunt for an assassin known as The Jackal in Frederick Forsyth's novel The Day of the Jackal.
The cross-country manhunt for the Fox River 8 in the second season of Prison Break.
The statewide manhunt for Dr. Richard Kimble in The Fugitive.
The manhunt for Robert "Butch" Haynes (Kevin Costner) in Clint Eastwood's "A Perfect World" (1993).
The cross-country manhunt for Mark Schereden in U.S. Marshals.
The manhunt throughout California for Adrian Monk in the Monk episode "Mr. Monk Is On The Run."
The citywide manhunt for Henry Darius in the CSI: NY episode "Manhattan Manhunt."
The nationwide manhunt for Francis Dolarhyde in Manhunter (1986) and Red Dragon (2002).
The international manhunt for Dr. Hannibal Lecter in both The Silence of the Lambs and Hannibal.
The manhunt for escaped prisoner/wizard Sirius Black in the Harry Potter book Harry Potter and the Prisoner of Azkaban.
The cross-country manhunt for notorious methamphetamine producer Heisenberg in the penultimate episodes of Breaking Bad.
The citywide manhunt for undercover DEA agent turned vigilante Max Payne in the video game Max Payne.
The worldwide manhunt by several different agencies for fugitive Jason Bourne in the Bourne series of movies.
Mac and Dennis hunt Rickety Cricket in a season 4 episode of It's Always Sunny in Philadelphia.
The FBI Fugitive Unit manhunt two couples on a killing spree in several states in the CBS drama FBI: Most Wanted.
The citywide manhunt for Eddie Munson in the fourth season of Stranger Things.

See also
Bounty hunter
Deadly force
Interpol
List of murderers by number of victims
Lone wolf (terrorism)
Manhunt (military)
Mexican drug war
War crime

References

 
Criminal investigation
Crime prevention
Law enforcement
Law enforcement terminology
Law enforcement techniques
Counterterrorism